is a passenger railway station in located in the city of Yokkaichi,  Mie Prefecture, Japan, operated by the private railway operator Kintetsu Railway.

Lines
Kawaramachi Station is served by the Nagoya Line, and is located 35.7 rail kilometers from the starting point of the line at Kintetsu Nagoya Station.

Station layout
The station consists of two opposed side platforms, connected by a level crossing.

is a railway station on the Nagoya Line in Yokkaichi, Mie Prefecture, Japan, operated by the private railway operator Kintetsu Railway. Kawaramachi Station is 35.7 rail kilometers from the terminus of the line at Kintetsu Nagoya Station.

Line
Kintetsu Nagoya Line

Station layout
Kawaramachi Station has two opposed elevated side platforms with the station building underneath.

Platforms

Adjacent stations

History
Kawaramachi Station opened on January 30, 1929, as a station on the Ise Railway. The Ise Railway became the Sangu Express Electric Railway’s Ise Line on September 15, 1936, and was renamed the Nagoya Line on December 7, 1938. After merging with Osaka Electric Kido on March 15, 1941, the line became the Kansai Express Railway's Nagoya Line. This line was merged with the Nankai Electric Railway on June 1, 1944, to form Kintetsu.

Passenger statistics
In fiscal 2019, the station was used by an average of 847 passengers daily (boarding passengers only).

Surrounding area
Banko no Sato Kaikan

See also
List of railway stations in Japan

References

External links

 Kintetsu: Kawaramachi Station

Railway stations in Japan opened in 1929
Railway stations in Mie Prefecture
Stations of Kintetsu Railway
Yokkaichi